The 1941 Boston University Terriers football team was an American football team that represented Boston University as an independent during the 1941 college football season. In its eighth and final season under head coach Pat Hanley, the team compiled a 5–3 record and outscored opponents by a total of 77 to 51. The team played its home games at the original Nickerson Field in Weston, Massachusetts.

Tackle George Radulski was the team captain.  The team's backfield stars were Pete Lamanna, Frank Provinzano, and Walter Williams.

After the December 7 Attack on Pearl Harbor, Boston University's coach Pat Hanley was commissioned as a major in the United States Marine Corps. He was the first head coach to join the military after the declaration of war.

Schedule

References

Boston University
Boston University Terriers football seasons
Boston University Terriers football